Pammene germmana is a moth belonging to the family Tortricidae first described by Jacob Hübner in 1799.
It is native to Europe.

The ground  colour is dark brown. There is series of cream-coloured strigulae along the costa, interspersed with bluish-metallic streaks.

The adults fly in May and June. 

The larvae feed in fruits of plum Prunus, Quercus and Crataegus''.

References

External links
lepiforum.de

Grapholitini